John Francis Morrill (February 19, 1855 – April 2, 1932), nicknamed "Honest John", was an American first baseman and manager in Major League Baseball who played from 1876 to 1890 for the Boston Red Caps/Beaneaters, Washington Nationals, and Boston Reds. Over the years he played all positions. Although he pitched a couple of games each season, he was primarily an infielder, and had a career batting average of .260.

Early life
Morrill's parents were Irish emigrants to Boston, where Morrill was born. He played for amateur teams including the Boston Stars and the Lowell Lowells prior to being signed by the Boston Red Legs in 1876.

Career
Morrill stood 5'11" and weighed 155 pounds as he began his major league career, and he had been known as a second baseman and catcher. Once he arrived in the major leagues, Morrill only played 23 games at catcher, all of them in his first season with Boston. An obituary stated that he was one of the last catchers to appear at the position without a glove.

In an incredible season in 1883, he batted .316, played six different positions, and led the Boston Beaneaters to the National League pennant after taking over as manager from Jack Burdock in midseason.

Popular baseball manager King Kelly described Morrill as a careful manager who saved Boston a great deal of money through his decisions. Kelly cited Morrill's understanding of the rules when he said that Morrill was a better manager than anyone besides Cap Anson. Kelly dismissed the popular notion that he did not get along with Morrill.

Later life
Morrill raised five children. After his retirement as a player, Morrill worked for a Boston sporting goods company, where he was manager and treasurer. He died at the age of 77 in Brookline, Massachusetts, and he was interred at the Holyhood Cemetery. The cause of death was pneumonia.

See also
List of Major League Baseball annual saves leaders
List of Major League Baseball player-managers

References

External links

1855 births
1932 deaths
Sportspeople from Brookline, Massachusetts
Major League Baseball first basemen
19th-century baseball players
Boston Red Caps players
Boston Beaneaters players
Washington Nationals (1886–1889) players
Washington Nationals (1886–1889) managers
Boston Reds (PL) players
Baseball players from Massachusetts
Boston Red Caps managers
Boston Beaneaters managers
Salem (minor league baseball) players
Major League Baseball player-managers
Burials at Holyhood Cemetery (Brookline)